Susanne Kristina Osthoff (born 7 March 1962 in Munich) is a German archaeologist who had worked in Iraq from 1991  until being taken hostage there on 25 November 2005. She was freed by her captors on 18 December 2005.

Biography 
Osthoff grew up in Grafing (Bavaria) with two brothers and one sister. Having finished school, she studied Near Eastern archaeology and Semitic languages at the Ludwig Maximilian University of Munich. During the course of her studies, she visited Turkey, Jordan, Iraq, Syria and Yemen to take part in excavations. She was married to a Jordanian, with whom she has a daughter, and has converted to Sunni Islam. Since 1991, she lived more or less continually in Iraq where she primarily worked as an archaeologist but also became involved as an aid worker.

Abduction 
In summer 2005, Osthoff, who had previously converted to Sunni Islam, allegedly received several threats of abduction which she relayed to American authorities. Although the threats were judged to be serious and the German embassy asked Osthoff to leave the country, Osthoff decided to stay in the country and continue her work. On 25 November, Osthoff and her driver vanished en route from Baghdad to Arbil; shortly after, a DVD containing a video clip was given to the ARD office in Baghdad. In the video, the two captives are shown surrounded by masked, armed men who read a statement demanding that the German government immediately cease all cooperation with the Iraqi government.

While the abduction was initially assumed to be politically motivated and probably instigated by Abu Musab al-Zarqawi, there was some speculation as to the real identity of the kidnappers. The very unprofessional quality of the video, along with the fact that the German government has long opposed American involvement in Iraq, led some experts to believe that the kidnappers were common criminals trying to extort money. Others point out that the timing of the abduction very shortly after a change of government in Germany and during a discussion of possible German participation in the training of Iraqi police forces does point towards a politically motivated kidnapping. Al Jazeera carried an article quoting Susanne Osthoff as saying that her kidnappers were not criminals and only demanded German humanitarian aid for Iraq's Sunni Arabs and stated they did not want a ransom.

Susanne Osthoff and her driver were freed from their captors on 18 December 2005.

Aftermath of the release 
In an interview with Arabic news-channel Al-Jazeera on 23 December, a mistake in translation by the DPA (German Press Agency) suggested that she wanted to return to Iraq to continue her projects. She was warned by German authorities that this would put her life in danger again and strongly discouraged from returning to Iraq. The German Department of Foreign Affairs even asked the Iraqi government to deny her a new visa.

In her first television interview in Germany, with ZDF, aired on Wednesday, 28 December, Osthoff reacted to questions in a seemingly incoherent manner and appeared in traditional Muslim clothing, including headscarf. This was said to be due to a lack of communication and preparation, but in the German public, many took it as a sign of estrangement. The interview was heavily edited for broadcast.

Speculations 
On 28 January 2006, the German magazine Focus reported that part of the ransom money alleged to have been paid by the German government to win the freedom of Susanne Osthoff was found on Osthoff after her release.
Without citing its sources, Focus said officials at the German embassy in Baghdad had found several thousand U.S. dollars in the 43-year-old German archaeologist's clothes when she took a shower at the embassy shortly after being freed.
The serial numbers on the bills allegedly matched those allegedly used by the government to pay off Osthoff's kidnappers. The German Foreign Ministry declined to comment. The German government is known to have paid ransoms for hostages in the past, but refused to comment on whether it did so for Osthoff.

She gave another interview during the German television chat show 'Beckmann' (ARD) on 8 January 2007, explaining that a certain amount of money had been given to her by the kidnappers as a compensation for the personal goods that had been stolen from her, some of which were quite valuable, e. g. a digital camera. She said she had shown the money to a German embassy official during their first meeting.

Furthermore, suspicions came up that the second victim, Osthoff's Iraqi driver, was involved in the abduction.

Another allegation is that Germany traded the terrorist Mohammed Ali Hamadi, who was convicted of the murder of US Navy sailor Robert Stethem during the hijacking of TWA Flight 847, for Susanne Osthoff.

See also
List of kidnappings
List of solved missing person cases

References

External links 

'No Rescue of German Hostage Imminent', Deutsche Welle, 6 December 2005
'Christians and Muslims pray for Iraq hostage', The Guardian, 12 December 2005
'German hostage in Iraq is free', Reuters, 18 December  2005
   Freed German hostage says Iraq captors not criminals , 27 December 2005 
  Osthoff-Fahrer Komplize der Geiselnehmer?, Tagesschau 22 December 2005
 "Totaler Kontrollverlust", Der Spiegel, 1/2006, pp 92–95

1962 births
20th-century archaeologists
2000s missing person cases
21st-century archaeologists
Archaeologists from Bavaria
Converts to Islam
Foreign hostages in Iraq
Formerly missing people
German Muslims
German people taken hostage
German women archaeologists
Kidnapped people
Living people
Missing person cases in Iraq
Women in the Iraq War
Ludwig Maximilian University of Munich alumni